Batayevka is a rural locality (a selo) and the administrative center of Batayevsky Selsoviet of Akhtubinsky District, Astrakhan Oblast, Russia. The population was 543 as of 2010. There are 16 streets.

Geography 
Batayevka is located 25 km southeast of Akhtubinsk (the district's administrative centre) by road. Uspenka is the nearest rural locality.

References 

Rural localities in Akhtubinsky District